Allez Oop is a 1934 American short comedy film starring Buster Keaton. It was the second film Keaton made for Educational Pictures.

Plot
Elmer (Buster Keaton) works at a clock repair shop and falls for a woman named Paula (Dorothy Sebastian), a customer who brings in her watch to be fixed. Eventually, Elmer invites Paula to go to the circus with him, where she soon becomes enamored with the lead trapeze artist (George J. Lewis). In an effort to win her heart, Elmer attempts to become an expert in acrobatics as well by practicing in his backyard with a swing and mattress, but with very little success. In the end, though, he is able to show his true mettle, performing amazing athletic feats in order to save Paula from a deadly fire.

Cast
 Buster Keaton as Elmer
 Dorothy Sebastian as Paula Stevens
 George J. Lewis as The Great Apollo
 Harry Myers as Circus spectator
 The Flying Escalantes as Acrobatic Troupe
 Leonard Kibrick as Boy watching Buster (uncredited)

See also
 List of American films of 1934
 Buster Keaton filmography

References

External links

 Allez Oop! at the International Buster Keaton Society

1934 films
1934 comedy films
American black-and-white films
Educational Pictures short films
Films directed by Buster Keaton
Films directed by Charles Lamont
American comedy short films
1930s American films